Fergus McPhail is an Australian children's comedy series that was released on Network Ten in 2004.

Plot summary
Fergus McPhail stumbles from crisis to crisis, mostly of his own making. His irrationally optimistic alter-ego acts as his conscience. The comedy series charts a year in the life of teenage Fergus McPhail at home with his erratic family, at school, among friends, and at play.

Cast List
 Sean Ohlendorf as Fergus McPhail
 Michael Harrison as Lambert Apanolty
 Brett Swain as Don McPhail (Dad)
 Tammy McCarthy as Moira McPhail (Mum)
 Miriam Glaser as Senga McPhail
 Jessie Jacobs as Jennifer McPhail
 Megan Harrington as Angela Dayton
 Heli Simpson as Sophie Bartolemeo
 Marcus Costello as Richmond Nixon-Claverhouse
 Reg Gorman as Harry Patterson
 John Williams as Thomas
 Nicholas Turner as Kevin
 Martin Sharpe as David
 Damien Bodie as Leon
 Alex Tsitsopoulos as Angelo
 Steven Bahnsen as Declan Parker
 Joy Westmore as Mrs Vance
 Chris Hemsworth as Craig
 Heidi Valkenburg as Maddie
 Carla Perone as  Baby Sophie

See also
 List of Australian television series

External links

Fergus McPhail at Australian Screen Online

Network 10 original programming
Australian children's television series
2004 Australian television series debuts
2004 Australian television series endings
Australian comedy television series